Fulwell is a neighbourhood of outer South West London in the London Borough of Richmond upon Thames. It straddles the west of the generally firmer ("ancient" parish and urban district) borders of Twickenham and Teddington, reinforced as local postcode districts. The name is first known in documents of the fifteenth century. It may be from a reliably full well or a corruption of foul well. Until 1965 Fulwell was in the  historic County of Middlesex.

The area has no postal limits, but references survive as part of ward name, Fulwell and Hampton Hill, Fulwell railway station, Fulwell Golf Course, Fulwell bus garage, Fulwell Park Avenue and Fulwell Road. Fulwell is often used by residents to state where they live.

In 2009, a proposal to remove the name from the local councillors' electoral district (ward) name was rejected.

Fulwell has an Anglican parish church, St Michael's, which, after a 15-year closure, was reopened for worship in 2014 and regained parish status in 2019.

History

Fulwell has migrated south.  It used to span onto the north bank of the Crane, which lies in Whitton, as the inset map shows.

Fulwell as today defined formed the southern extent of Hounslow Heath and the near-surface raised Taplow gravel that defined it. A reference to assarts at Fulwell dating from around 1200 are amongst the earliest records of the name. The area was progressively enclosed for agriculture and increasingly urbanised since the Victorian period of metropolitan expansion of outer London.

Fulwell bus depot was built in 1902 as a hub for trams and trolley cars as well as buses.

Historically in Middlesex, In 1965 Fulwell became a part of the London Borough of Richmond in the newly formed ceremonial county of Greater London.

Fulwell Lodge and Fulwell Park
West of common land and north of the Staines Road, at the western extreme of Twickenham's long parish (that is, omitting Whitton's western gunpowder mills and farms) stood a grand house; Fulwell Lodge. At first owned with Yorke/Fulwell Farm to its north, it dated from the early 17th century.
In 1871 Charles James Freake, a London property developer, bought Fulwell Lodge, its grounds and estate worker's cottages. This extended south from the A316 Chertsey Road and Crane, included the west of later housing often considered Twickenham Green rather than West Twickenham and what became Strawberry Hill Golf Course.  It lay north-west of the Shepperton Branch Line encompassing what is now Fulwell Golf Course and as far as Apex Corner where the A312 Uxbridge Road meets the A316. Freake named the area Fulwell Park. 
After Freake's death in 1884 this passed to his wife, who saw the golf course built in the west, and, on her death in 1900, was held by Freake Estates until 1910. The exiled last King of Portugal, Manoel/Manuel II, bought as his English home Fulwell Lodge from shortly after his marriage in 1913 until his death in 1932.

The lodge and its acres of grounds were then bought by Wates and demolished.  It was redeveloped as houses, with some low-rise, landscaped-grounds flats. The history is kept through the names: Manoel Road, Lisbon Avenue, Augusta Road and Portugal Gardens.

Nearest places

References

External links
Twickenham Museum Hampton & Teddington Past by John Sheaf and Ken Howe
Hidden London: Fulwell, Richmond upon Thames

Areas of London
Districts of the London Borough of Richmond upon Thames